Alejandro Miguel "Álex" Mula Sánchez (born 23 July 1996) is a Spanish professional footballer who plays mainly as a right winger for Polish club Wisła Kraków.

Club career
Born in Barcelona, Catalonia, Mula joined Málaga CF's youth setup in 2011, from RCD Espanyol. He made his debut with the reserves on 30 March 2013 at the age of 17, starting in a 1–2 Tercera División home loss against UD San Pedro.

Mula scored his first senior goals on 7 September 2014, netting a hat-trick in a 7–0 home routing of CD Español del Alquián. He subsequently became a regular starter for the B-side in the following seasons, scoring a career-best 11 goals in 2016–17.

After playing regularly with the first team during the 2017 pre-season, Mula was promoted to the main squad by manager Míchel. He made his first team – and La Liga – debut on 26 August of that year, starting in a 0–1 away loss against Girona FC.

On 31 January 2018, Mula was loaned to Segunda División side CD Tenerife for the remainder of the campaign. He scored his first professional goal on 26 February, netting the last in a 3–1 home defeat of CD Lugo.

On 9 March 2018, Mula scored a brace in a 3–1 home win over Real Oviedo. Returning to Málaga (now also in the second division) for 2018–19, he contributed with 11 appearances and was definitely promoted to the main squad in July 2019.

On 8 January 2020, after spending the first half of the 2019–20 campaign unregistered due to Málaga's financial problems, Mula was loaned to fellow second division side AD Alcorcón until June.

On 23 August 2020, Mula agreed to a four-year contract with CF Fuenlabrada, still in division two. On 2 February 2022, he returned to Alkor also in a temporary deal.

On 17 December 2022, he signed a deal until the end of the season with Polish second division side Wisła Kraków.

References

External links

1996 births
Living people
Footballers from Barcelona
Spanish footballers
Association football wingers
La Liga players
Segunda División players
Tercera División players
Atlético Malagueño players
Málaga CF players
CD Tenerife players
AD Alcorcón footballers
CF Fuenlabrada footballers
Wisła Kraków players
Spain youth international footballers
Spanish expatriate footballers
Expatriate footballers in Poland
Spanish expatriate sportspeople in Poland